is a Japanese football player. He plays for Albirex Niigata on loan from Kashiwa Reysol.

Career
Daichi Tagami joined J2 League club V-Varen Nagasaki in 2016.

Club statistics
Updated to end of 2018 season.

References

External links
Profile at V-Varen Nagasaki

1993 births
Living people
Ryutsu Keizai University alumni
Association football people from Chiba Prefecture
Japanese footballers
J1 League players
J2 League players
V-Varen Nagasaki players
Kashiwa Reysol players
Albirex Niigata players
Association football defenders
Universiade bronze medalists for Japan
Universiade medalists in football